The Holy Trinity Serbian Orthodox Church is a Serbian Orthodox Church located in Regina, Saskatchewan. It is part of the Serbian Orthodox Eparchy of Canada. It is located at 928 Eleventh Avenue and Winnipeg Street in Regina. It has the distinction of being the first Serbian church to be built in the Dominion of Canada, being built in 1912. The second oldest Serbian church in Canada is the St. Nikola Serbian Orthodox Church on Barton Street in Hamilton, inaugurated in 1917.

History
The first Serbs to arrive in Saskatchewan came during the second wave of Serb emigration to Canada, between 1900 and 1914. They emigrated from the Austria-Hungary provinces of Croatia and Vojvodina, what once comprised the Military Frontier. In Saskatchewan they made their homestead in the Rural Municipality of McCraney No. 282 between the area of Kenaston and Bladworth while others settled in Truax, Avonlea and Claybank. There most of them took up farming. A few moved to different places in Canada and the United States, where they sought different type of work in more tolerable climates.

Founding the church-school congregation
In 1912, those who remained in Regina and the area decided to establish a church-school congregation.  The Serbians generally use the term "church-school congregation" everywhere in the diaspora where others might use "parish".  The word "parish" has historical associations with Western ecclesiastical government, and the Serbs prefer to guard the Orthodox spiritual mentality.  At the first organizational meeting, there were 48 persons present.  They immediately began the process to build a Temple.  Stevan and Sava Djurišić donated a lot at McAra street on which to build the future Temple.  It should be noted, however, that the other families contributed as well for this major undertaking.  Those families were : Inić, Jakovlejev, Skerletov, Maksimović, Knežović, Petrov, Velemirov, Trifunov, Milanov, Matić, Stojadinov, Erdeljan, and others.  They began the construction in 1911, and it was completed in 1912.  The new Temple was built in the 17th block of McAra Street in the eastern part of the city.

Soon Serbian activity swelled during the first two decades of the 20th century, triggered by politics of pre-World War I and its aftermath and the emancipation of at least 10 nations (including the Kingdom of Serbs, Croats, and Slovenes) that were formerly part of the Austrian Empire. In the Dominion of Canada Serbs in the Maritimes, Québec, Ontario, the Prairies, British Columbia and the Northern territories of Yukon began agitating for change in British colonial policies towards their treatment of immigrants. The branding of anyone born in Austria-Hungary and Ottoman Empire with the stigma of "enemy aliens" became intolerable not only in Regina but elsewhere in the vast expanse of the Canadian Dominion. Hundreds of front-page headlines in newspapers spoke of the injustices resulting from the draconian measures imposed by Ottawa and London. In a speech in Regina War veteran Bud Protich raised the question of recognizing Serbs and Serbia as Empire's Allies

With the war's end, the Regina Serbs gathered on 6 March 1919 to generously donate to the Saskatchewan Serbian Relief Committee after Helen Losanitch Frothingham
paid a visit and spoke of the hardships in Serbia.

In 1925, nearly 500 people attended the Easter services at the little church on McAra street. Another significant year was 1933 when the church was moved 18 blocks away to 11th Avenue and Winnipeg Street. Two years later, a parish hall was constructed on the same site, next to the church.

The 50th Anniversary of the Church of the Holy Trinity in Regina took place in 1966 with much pomp and circumstance and the publication of a commemorative book. But from then on Church life seemed to wane in the 1970s until a Sports Centre under the auspices of the church was formed with Diocesan approval. The parish rectory and residence for the Bishop in the same building was blessed on 29 October 1980 by Bishop Sava Vuković. On 6 August 1983 Bishop Christopher visited Regina for the first time with hopes of revitalizing the Church community.

The parish was without a regular priest since 1968.

With the arrival of Rev. Mirko Malinović and new immigrants to Regina in 1985, the possibilities of church life renewal grew. Father Mirko paid heed to his duties as a parish priest, but most of all he conducted the parish educational program which was lacking at the time. He was assisted by the Church-School volunteer staff. Soon, a new breath of life came into the parish.

In 1991 the Holy Trinity Church needed major repairs after 75 years of its existence. At a special meeting, the congregation decided to renovate the Church. By 1992 it was completely renovated. Bishop Georgije placed relics of St. Lazar on the Altar of the renovated church since there were no relics in the Holy Table. The new iconostasis crafted by Momčilo Milosević of Preljina (near Čačak) was installed. The frescoes were painted by Dragan Marunić.

The members of the Church School Congregation generously donated to the construction of Church of Saint Sava at Vračar plateau in Belgrade and collected aid for Serbian refugees during the Yugoslav Wars, NATO bombing and its aftermath, the reconstruction period. The Church School Congregation was a great benefactor of the Holy Transfiguration Monastery in Milton. On the recommendation of Bishop Georgije, the Holy Synod awarded the Church School Congregation with the Order of Saint Sava.

Church's Centennial Year
In 2012, the 100th anniversary of the founding of this parish, there were 2 significant events. To celebrate this significant anniversary, there was a celebration of the Divine Liturgy, with a procession around the Temple.  The Divine Liturgy was concelebrated by five priests.  In addition, there were special festivities with food and entertainment to mark the occasion.  This was the first Serbian Orthodox Christian Temple to be established in Canada, dating back to its founding in 1912. In order to mark this occasion, people came from across the country in order to participate in this significant moment for the diocese, based in Milton.

Personalities
 James Trifunov
 Bud Protich
 Anthony V. Seferovitch

See also
 Saint Petka Serbian Orthodox Church
 Serbian Orthodox Eparchy of Canada
 Holy Transfiguration Monastery
 Holy Trinity Serbian Orthodox Church (Montreal)
 Saint Sava Serbian Orthodox Church (Toronto)
 Saint Arsenije Sremac Serbian Orthodox Church
 All Serbian Saints Serbian Orthodox Church (Mississauga)
 Saint Michael the Archangel Serbian Orthodox Church (Toronto)
 St. Stefan Serbian Orthodox Church (Ottawa)
 Saint Nicholas Serbian Orthodox Cathedral (Hamilton, Ontario)
 Serbian Canadians

Bibliography
 Canadian Serbs: A History of Their Social and Cultural Traditions (1956-2002) by Vladimir A. Tomović, 2002, page 115
 War Comes to Regina, For All We Have and Are: Regina and the Experience of the Great War by James M. Pitsula, 2011, pages 21–44 and 178
 Civilian Internment in Canada by John Morchoruk and Rhonda L. Hinther, 2020, page 111

References 

Churches in Regina, Saskatchewan
Serbian Orthodox church buildings in Canada
Churches completed in 1912
1912 establishments in Saskatchewan
20th-century churches in Canada